"Conquest of Paradise" is a song recorded by Greek composer Vangelis. It was the soundtrack from Ridley Scott's  1992 film 1492: Conquest of Paradise and the lead single from the album of the same name. The song achieved success in many territories, including Flanders, Germany, the Netherlands, and Switzerland where it topped the singles chart, but was a relative failure in UK where it only peaked at number 60. The song's popularity had been boosted in Germany by boxer Henry Maske using it as his theme song.

Its chord progression is based on the old European theme La Follia.

Track listings
CD single
"Conquest Of Paradise" – 4:47
"Moxica And The Horse" – 7:12

CD maxi-single
"Conquest Of Paradise" – 4:47
"Moxica And The Horse" – 7:12
"Line Open" – 4:43
"Landscape" – 1:37

 Includes two songs ("Line Open" and "Landscape"), which were not included in the album.

Lyrics
Throughout the whole song, the following lyrics in Pseudo-Latin were repeated several times:

In nòreni per ìpe,
in noreni coràh;
tirà mine per ìto,
ne dominà.

One time this refrain is:

In ròmine tirmèno,
ne ròmine to fa,
imàgine pro mèno,
per imentirà.

Credits
Choir: The English Chamber Choir
Composed and arranged by Vangelis
Choir conductor: Guy Protheroe
Produced by Frederick Rousseau
Recorded and mixed by Philippe Colonna, at Epsilon Laboratory, Paris

Charts

Weekly charts

Year-end charts

Certifications

In popular culture

Covers
The song has been covered by many artists, including Blake, Klaus Schulze, Free the Spirit, the Vienna Symphonic Orchestra Project, Kati Kovács, John Williams and the Boston Pops Orchestra (1996), Daylight (1997), Daniel Hůlka (1998), Dana Winner (2002), The Ten Tenors (2004), Rhydian (2009) and Gregorian (2012).

At sport events
"Conquest of Paradise" is played at home games for the New Zealand Super Rugby team Crusaders and Super League teams Widnes Vikings and Wigan Warriors. These days it is the unofficial theme tune for the city of Christchurch where the Crusaders rugby team is based. English football club Sheffield Wednesday also play Conquest of Paradise prior to their theme tune before kick off. "Conquest of Paradise" was also played at the Cricket World Cup (2011) and (2015) just before the national anthems of the two contesting national teams were played at the start of every match. It was also played during the 2010 and 2014 cricket World Twenty20 championships to uphold International Cricket Council's "spirit-of-cricket" concept just before the national anthems of the two playing teams. The Ultra-Trail du Mont-Blanc series uses "Conquest of Paradise" at the start, finish and prize ceremonies of its various ultramarathon races. It is also used by the Engadin Skimarathon to introduce the start of the competitors waves. At least in the years 2010–2013. Usually every minute it is interrupted to announce the time until "go!". German boxer Henry Maske used it as his theme song. At the long-distance sled-dog race Finnmarkslopet in Norway, the song is played every time a dog team crosses the finish line.

In TV shows and cinema
It was used for many years in the Jeux Sans Frontières, using it during the credits. The single "Conquest of Paradise" has also been inserted in the 2007 Chinese television drama series Soldiers Sortie, and is used as the theme song in the Hindi film, Koyla (1997), Kaalapani (1996) and a Tamil film, Sundara Purushan  (1996). The song was also used in the trailer for Mission to Mars (2000). It's also part of the soundtrack of The Man from U.N.C.L.E. (2015), by Guy Richie.

References

Songs about Christopher Columbus
Film theme songs
1992 singles
1994 singles
1995 singles
Ultratop 50 Singles (Flanders) number-one singles
Number-one singles in Germany
Dutch Top 40 number-one singles
Number-one singles in Switzerland
Vangelis songs
Songs written for films
1992 songs
Songs with music by Vangelis
Song recordings produced by Vangelis
East West Records singles